AfroBasket Women 2017 Qualification occurred on various dates on 2017. It determined which African national basketball teams would qualify for the AfroBasket Women 2017. Teams competed with other teams in their respective "zones" for a spot in the Championship tournament.

Qualified Teams
Five teams qualified for the tournament before the qualification round took place. Seven more teams claimed spots in the tournament through Zonal Qualifying.

Zones

Zone 1
 : Tunisia and Morocco were supposed to compete for the only ticket on offer for FIBA Africa Zone 1 teams for the Final Round that was scheduled to be played April 7-9 in Tunisia. However Morocco pulled out of the regional qualifier.

Zone 2
 : Guinea and Cape Verde were supposed to compete for the only ticket on offer for FIBA Africa Zone 2 teams for the Final Round. However Cape Verde pulled out the regional qualifier.

Zone 3
A regional tournament was held from 12 to 13 May 2017 in Abidjan, Ivory Coast.

Zone 4

A regional tournament was held from 17 to 18 June 2017 in Kinshasa, DR Congo.

Zone 5

Zone 6

Wildcard
FIBA Africa on Wednesday awarded the wild card for FIBA Women's AfroBasket 2017 to the Central African Republic.

References

External links 
 2017 FIBA Women's Afrobasket Qualifiers

qualification
2017 in African basketball